The 1986–1987 Highland Football League was expanded to eighteen teams when Cove Rangers, formerly of the North Juniors was elected in.

It was won by Inverness Thistle, and Ross County finished bottom.

Teams

Table

References

Highland Football League seasons
Highland